Madan Saddle (‘Madanska Sedlovina’ \ma-'dan-ska se-dlo-vi-'na\) is a saddle of elevation 1110 m in Imeon Range on Smith Island, South Shetland Islands bounded by Neofit Peak to the northeast and Riggs Peak to the south-southwest.  Overlooking Gramada Glacier to the southeast.  Bulgarian early mapping in 2009.  Named after the town of Madan in the Rhodope Mountains, southern Bulgaria.

Maps
Chart of South Shetland including Coronation Island, &c. from the exploration of the sloop Dove in the years 1821 and 1822 by George Powell Commander of the same. Scale ca. 1:200000. London: Laurie, 1822.
  L.L. Ivanov. Antarctica: Livingston Island and Greenwich, Robert, Snow and Smith Islands. Scale 1:120000 topographic map. Troyan: Manfred Wörner Foundation, 2010.  (First edition 2009. )
 South Shetland Islands: Smith and Low Islands. Scale 1:150000 topographic map No. 13677. British Antarctic Survey, 2009.
 Antarctic Digital Database (ADD). Scale 1:250000 topographic map of Antarctica. Scientific Committee on Antarctic Research (SCAR). Since 1993, regularly upgraded and updated.
 L.L. Ivanov. Antarctica: Livingston Island and Smith Island. Scale 1:100000 topographic map. Manfred Wörner Foundation, 2017.

References
 Madan Saddle. SCAR Composite Antarctic Gazetteer
 Bulgarian Antarctic Gazetteer. Antarctic Place-names Commission. (details in Bulgarian, basic data in English)

External links
 Madan Saddle. Copernix satellite image

Mountain passes of Smith Island (South Shetland Islands)
Bulgaria and the Antarctic